Ballspielverein Borussia 09 e.V. Dortmund, commonly known as Borussia Dortmund, BVB, or simply Dortmund, is a German sports club based in Dortmund, North Rhine-Westphalia (Borussia is the Latin equivalent of Prussia). 

Borussia Dortmund was founded in 1909 by eighteen football players from Dortmund. Borussia Dortmund have won eight German championships, five DFB-Pokals, six DFL-Supercups, one UEFA Champions League, one UEFA Cup Winners' Cup, and one Intercontinental Cup. Their Cup Winners' Cup win in 1966 made them the first German club to win a European title.

This is the list of all Borussia Dortmund's European matches.

Overall record

By competition

By country

Results

Source: UEFA.com, Last updated on 7 March 2023.Pld = Matches played; W = Matches won; D = Matches drawn; L = Matches lost; GF = Goals for; GA = Goals against; GD = Goal Difference.

References

Europe
German football clubs in international competitions